Tavistock is a borough in Camden County, in the U.S. state of New Jersey. As of the 2020 United States census, the borough's population was 9, an increase of 4 (+80.0%) from the 2010 census count of 5, which in turn reflected a decline of 19 (−79.2%) from the 24 counted in the 2000 census. As of the 2010 Census it was the smallest municipality by population in New Jersey, with seven fewer residents than nearby Pine Valley, which had 12.

Tavistock was incorporated as a borough by an act of the New Jersey Legislature on February 16, 1921, from portions of the now-defunct Centre Township. The name of the borough came from the estate in England of a family of early settlers.

The borough was formed in order to allow the members of Tavistock Country Club to play golf on Sundays by members of the Victor Talking Machine Company. This was prohibited at the Haddon Country Club which was governed by a local blue law prohibiting sporting activities on Sundays. Tavistock's secession from Haddonfield, New Jersey, the original site of the club, is said to have been driven by the fact that Haddonfield was (and remains) a dry borough, though Tavistock was formed in 1921 during Prohibition when liquor would have been banned. Members of the club included State Senator Joseph Wallworth and Assembly Speaker T. Harry Rowland, who helped push the bill that created the new municipality to unanimous approval in the New Jersey Legislature.

Geography

According to the United States Census Bureau, the borough had a total area of 0.28 square miles (0.71 km2), including 0.27 square miles (0.71 km2) of land and <0.01 square miles (0.01 km2) of water (1.07%).

The borough borders Barrington, Haddonfield, and Lawnside.

Demographics

2010 census
The 2010 United States Census counted 5 people in 3 households. Two households consisted of married couples and the third was a male over 65 years of age living alone. The population density was 19.7 per square mile (7.6/km2). The borough contained 3 housing units at an average density of 11.8 per square mile (4.6/km2). All residents were white. Two residents were aged 25 to 44 and three were older than 65. The median age was 66.3 years.

Due to the borough's population, the Census Bureau's 2006–2010 American Community Survey did not include information about income and poverty for residents.

2000 census
As of the 2000 United States census there were 24 people, 7 households, and 7 families residing in the borough. The racial makeup of the borough was 91.67% White and 8.33% African American.

There were 7 households, out of which 57.1% had children under the age of 18 living with them, 71.4% were married couples living together, 14.3% had a female householder with no husband present, and 0.0% were non-families. No households were made up of individuals, and none had someone living alone who was 65 years of age or older. The average household size was 3.43 and the average family size was 3.43.

In the borough the population was spread out, with 37.5% under the age of 18, 8.3% from 18 to 24, 25.0% from 25 to 44, 20.8% from 45 to 64, and 8.3% who were 65 years of age or older. The median age was 38 years. For every 100 females, there were 100.0 males. For every 100 females age 18 and over, there were 87.5 males.

The median income for a household in the borough was $58,750, and the median income for a family was $36,875. Males had a median income of $76,250 versus $46,250 for females. The per capita income for the borough was $14,600. There are 20.0% of families living below the poverty line and 21.7% of the population, including 25.0% of under eighteens and none of those over 64.

Government

Local government
Tavistock operates under the Walsh Act form of New Jersey municipal government. The borough is one of 30 municipalities (of the 564) statewide that use the commission form of government. The governing body is comprised of three non-partisan commissioners, who are elected at-large on a non-partisan basis to concurrent four-year terms of office as part of the May municipal election. Each commissioner is assigned a specific department to head in addition to their legislative functions and one commissioner is chosen to serve as mayor. Tavistock has been governed under the Walsh Act by a three-member commission, since 1928.

, Tavistock's commissioners are Mayor Joseph Del Duca, Colin Mack-Allen and Mindy Del Duca, all serving concurrent terms of office ending December 31, 2025.

In 2018, the borough had an average property tax bill of $31,376, the highest in the county, compared to an average bill of $8,767 statewide and more than double the average bill of $15,182 in runner-up Haddonfield.

Federal, state and county representation
Tavistock is located in the 1st Congressional District and is part of New Jersey's 6th state legislative district.

Politics
As of March 2011, there were a total of seven registered voters in Tavistock, of which none were registered as Democrats, six (85.7%) were registered as Republicans and one (14.3%) was registered as Unaffiliated. There were no voters registered to other parties.

In the 2012 presidential election, Republican Mitt Romney received 66.7% of the vote (2 cast), ahead of Democrat Barack Obama with 33.3% (1 vote), and other candidates receiving no votes, among the 3 ballots cast by the borough's 6 registered voters for a turnout of 50.0%. In the 2008 presidential election, Republican John McCain received 71.4% of the vote (5 cast), ahead of Democrat Barack Obama, who received around 28.6% (2 votes), with 7 ballots cast among the borough's 7 registered voters, for a turnout of 100.0%. In the 2004 presidential election, Republican George W. Bush received 88.9% of the vote (8 ballots cast), outpolling Democrat John Kerry, who received 11.1% (1 vote), with 9 ballots cast among the borough's 11 registered voters, for a turnout percentage of 81.8.

In the 2013 gubernatorial election, Republican Chris Christie received 100.0% of the vote (1 cast), ahead of Democrat Barbara Buono and other candidates who received no votes, among the 4 ballots cast by the borough's 5 registered voters (3 ballots were spoiled), for a turnout of 80.0%. In the 2009 gubernatorial election, Republican Chris Christie received 100.0% of the vote (5 ballots cast), ahead of both Democrat Jon Corzine and Independent Chris Daggett who received none, with 5 ballots cast among the borough's 7 registered voters, yielding a 71.4% turnout.

Education
Tavistock is a non-operating school district. Public school students in Tavistock are served by the Haddonfield Public Schools in the adjoining community of Haddonfield as part of a sending/receiving relationship, together with students from Pine Valley. As of the 2018–2019 school year, the district, comprised of five schools, had an enrollment of 2,749 students and 215.2 classroom teachers (on an FTE basis), for a student–teacher ratio of 12.8:1. Schools in the district (with 2018–2019 enrollment data from the National Center for Education Statistics) are 
Central Elementary School with 419 students in grades K–5, 
Elizabeth Haddon Elementary School with 367 students in grades K–5,
J. Fithian Tatem Elementary School with 422 students in grades Pre-K–5, 
Haddonfield Middle School with 659 students in grades 6–8 and 
Haddonfield Memorial High School with 869 students in grades 9–12.

Transportation

Roads and highways

Interstate 295 passes through but the nearest interchange is immediately over the border in neighboring Haddonfield. The New Jersey Turnpike runs briefly through Tavistock, although the nearest exit is for Bellmawr and Runnemede. The road serving the borough's residences and the country club, Tavistock Lane, sits on the border of Tavistock and Haddonfield.

Public transportation
NJ Transit local bus service is available on the 451 route between Camden and the Lindenwold station.

Notable people

People who were born in, residents of, or otherwise closely associated with Tavistock include:

 John Aglialoro (born 1943), businessman and film producer
 Joan Carter (born 1943), businesswoman and philanthropist

References

External links

 Official website

 
1921 establishments in New Jersey
Boroughs in Camden County, New Jersey
New Jersey District Factor Group none
Populated places established in 1921
Walsh Act